Lovere is a town and comune in the province of Bergamo, in Lombardy, northern Italy, at the northwest end of Lake Iseo.

The houses in the city have overhanging wooden roofs, typical of Switzerland, combined with the heavy stone arcades of Italy. It lies on a lake and is flanked by a semicircle of mountains. Lovere takes part in The most beautiful villages in Italy competition run by an association which monitors small Italian towns with artistic and historical interest. In 2018, Lovere was the only Lombardy town to finish in the top 20 of Italy's most beautiful towns.

History
The first known settlement in the Lovere area dates to the 5th and 4th century BC, being of Celtic origin. Later it was conquered by the Romans, attracted by its strategic position location between the Val Camonica and the Val Cavallina, as well as for its transport potential on the Lake Iseo.

After the fall of the Western Roman Empire it was ruled by the Lombards and the Franks. Given to the monks of the Marmoutier Abbey, it was sold to the Bishops of Bergamo, who, at the time of the Guelphs and Ghibellines struggle, were in turn replaced by the Celeri family. The fights lasted until the mid-15th century, when the territory was conquered by the Republic of Venice, whose rule lasted until the French invasion in 1797.

The English aristocrat and writer Lady Mary Wortley Montagu  spent ten years of her life on the shores of Lake Iseo.

Main sights
Santa Maria in Valvendra, a parish church built initially in Gothic style before 1473, then replaced by Renaissance forms. It has with a nave and two aisles, and houses works by Gian Paolo Cavagna, Domenico Carpinoni and Piero Marone.
Palazzo Tadini, a palace and art gallery including paintings by Barbelli, Il Cerano, Pietro Damini, Jacopo Ligozzi, CF Nuvolone, Santo Prunati, Pietro Ricchi, Elisabetta Sirani, Paris Bordone, Ceruti, Cifrondi, Luigi Frisoni, Fra' Galgario,  GD Tiepolo, Francesco Zugno and others. Paintings from the 19th century include works by Eduardo Arroyo, Bengt Lindstrom, Emilio Vedova and others. The palace is also home to marble sculptures by Benzoni, Johann Weigel, Andrea Chierici, Luciano Zambetti and Canova. The museum also contains a collection of terracotta, porcelain, antique armor and armaments, and furniture. Palazzo Tadini houses also a zoological collection. 
San Giorgio  church, dating from 1263, although mostly rebuilt in the mid-15th century. It houses a Last Supper by Cavagana and Trinity with the Virgin by Palma the Younger.
Santa Chiara, a Clarissan monastery built in the early 16th century. It has some works by Sebastiano Conca.
San Martino oratory, dated by some to the 9th century, and including some recently rediscovered frescoes in the apse.
Castelliere, an ancient fortification, some portions of which date from the 3rd century BC.

Economy
Lovere possesses a metallurgic plant, Lucchini RS, which employs about 1300 people and specializes in the manufacture of railroad wheels and axles.

People
1906 Medicine Nobel Prize Camillo Golgi studied in Lovere's Liceo Classico. Giacomo Agostini, all-time leader in victories in motorcycle Grand Prix history, was born in Lovere in 1942.  Leading cinema critic and RAI author Enrico Ghezzi was born in Lovere in 1952.

Eros Cerutti studied at Liceo Decio Celeri before emigrating to the USA where he became President of Stella D'Oro Biscuit Company which became the largest manufacturers of Breadsticks in the world.

The alpine skiers Elena, Nadia and Sabrina Fanchini also come from Lovere.

External links 
Borghitalia website
Enciclopedia De Agostini
Regione Lombardia

References